The Gdańsk University of Technology (Gdańsk Tech, former GUT) is a technical university in the Wrzeszcz borough of Gdańsk, and one of the oldest universities in Poland. It has eight faculties and with 41 fields of study and more than 18 thousand undergraduate, as well as about 626 doctoral students. It employs 2768 people, including 1313 academic teachers.

Some degree courses and various specialisations are taught in English. Moreover, some of the courses offered by Gdańsk Tech are unique in Poland, for instance ones in Construction Chemistry, Nanotechnology, Geodesy and Cartography, as well as Engineering of Natural Resources. 
Students have access to specialist laboratories, lecture theatres with multimedia facilities, a library with 1.2 million volumes and various sports facilities. Undergraduates can also join one or more of 60 student science or language societies as well as other organisations. 
Gdańsk Tech is the first and only Polish university to be a member of the CDIO Initiative, founded by the Massachusetts Institute of Technology in collaboration with Chalmers University of Technology in Sweden. CDIO aims to provide an education for engineers that enables them to “Conceive, Design, Implement and Operate” pro-industrial technological systems.
Active member of a number of university networks and associations, e.g. Baltic Science Research (coordination of nanotechnology research and education), Baltic University Network (Uppsala Protocol) and the Baltic Sea Region University Network.

In October 2015, the school became a member of CESAER. In 2016, it was listed as one of the 800 best universities in the world by Times Higher Education World University Rankings.

With over nine people applying for one place at the university, Gdańsk Tech was ranked at the first position on the list of the most popular Polish universities in 2017. The ranking was published by the Ministry of Science and Higher Education. Gdańsk Tech also ranked 4th among technical universities and 9th among all universities in Poland in the prestigious higher education ranking prepared by the „Perspektywy” Educational Foundation.

Gdańsk University of Technology has an international institutional accreditation EUA – IEP (European University Association – Institutional Evaluation Programme).

History
The university was founded in 1904 as Königliche Technische Hochschule zu Danzig, in Danzig, which was part of the German Empire. Since the Middle Ages, Danzig, or Gdańsk in Polish, was a German-speaking Hanseatic city. The history of Gdańsk is complex and the city itself belonged, at different times to Poland and Germany. By the decision of Treaty of Versailles in the period of 1920–1939 it had become a "free city". The names of the city's educational institutions were affected by the changes in the city status. 
The university was known by different names: 
 1918–1921: Technische Hochschule in Danzig (Wyższa Szkoła Techniczna w Gdańsku)
 1921–1939: Technische Hochschule der Freien Stadt Danzig (Wyższa Szkoła Techniczna Wolnego Miasta Gdańska)
 1939–1941: Technische Hochschule Danzig
 1941–1945: Reichshochschule Danzig

Following the take over of the city by the Red Army, the Soviets arranged stables and barracks in other buildings. In 1945, all Germans were expelled from the city of Gdańsk and the burned ruins were turned into a Polish university (24.05.1945). In light of tragic history of the university under Nazi rule, today's university officially does not continue traditions of pre-war schools and its history starts in 1945.

The school was reorganized and rebuilt under the supervision of Stanisław Turski, a Polish mathematician and former inmate of German concentration camps. Turski also served as the first post-war rector of the university.
Important dates in Gdańsk University of Technology history:
1900 – The cornerstone is laid for the university building 
1904 – King's Technical High School is created 
1941–1945 – The university is subordinated to Nazi Germany 
1945 – On May 24, the university became a Polish state academy 
2004 – The 100-year anniversary of founding a Gdańsk University of Technology 
2014 – The 110-year anniversary of founding a Gdańsk University of Technology 
2020 – Smart University

Location
The Gdańsk University of Technology (Gdańsk Tech) is located in Gdańsk – a city of more-than-1000-year-old tradition, situated at the mouth of the Vistula River on the Baltic Sea. Gdańsk is the capital of the Pomeranian region and has nearly 500 000 inhabitants. 

The Main Campus is situated in the centre of old Wrzeszcz – a district which has good communication with other parts of Gdańsk. The campus is located on Narutowicza Street.

Scientific traditions

Johannes Hevelius (1611–1687) created the first world's great astronomical observatory equipped with telescopes. Hevelius was also a physicist because he discovered centuries old changes in magnetic declination. He was technician too, because he constructed Poland's first pendulum clock, conceived, designed and built the first world's periscope, as well as the first micrometer screw which belongs today to the Gdańsk City Council.

Daniel Gabriel Fahrenheit (1686–1736) was born in Gdańsk. He is mainly known for being the first to use mercury in temperature measuring devices (previously alcohol was used) and developed his own scale of 0 to 212 degrees.

Hevelius and Fahrenheit, the two distinguished physicists who are considered as representatives of Polish science, have their own places of rembrance at Gdańsk University of Technology. By virtue of the Resolution of the Senate, the Courtyards in the Main Building of Gdańsk University of Technology have been named after the two scientists. Both of them have been commemorated with reliefs that have been designed by the scientists of Gdańsk University of Technology with the help of genetic algorithms and a specially designed computer application running on Gdańsk Tech's supercomputer.

Historic places 
The main building, designed by Hermann Eggertt and Albert Carsten, was built between 1900 and 1904 and constructed at the same time as the Electro-Technical Institute, Machine Laboratory and the Chemical Institute. All the buildings were designed in the style of the Northern Renaissance with the elements of Art Nouveau. Several stone images that decorate the front represent in symbols the purpose of the building. The Medusa head above the main entrance protects the building against intruders and signifies energy. The images above the eastern side gate are a lighthouse and the tower of St. Mary's Church, while those over the western gate are a partially damaged likeness of a steam engine and a bow of a ship. Portraits of Prussian scientists and pioneers of the 19th-century engineering are to be found above the windows of the upper ground floor – the architect Karl Friedrich Schinkel, physicist Gotthilf H. L. Hagen, a manufacturer of steam engines Johann F. A. Borsig and a naval architect Ferdinand Schichau. The ornamental gutters are decorated with copper spouts in the shape of four male figures holding water monsters.

The Clock Tower destroyed in 1945 was restored to the roof of the main building on the 13th of May 2012. The tower is 18m high, weighs 15 tons and is crowned with a gilded image of the Allegory of Science. The main building encloses inner courtyards covered by glass domes designed by W. Czabański and Z. Wilk and installed in 2004. In 2012 the South Courtyard was officially renamed in honour of Johannes Hevelius. The Foucault pendulum is designed to show the rotation of the Earth on its axis.  It is named after the French physicist who first performed a similar experiment at the Paris Pantheon in 1851. The machine that made its appearance in 2005 in the South Courtyard of Gdansk University of Technology is a 64 kg metal disc suspended on a 26m arm. The movement of the pendulum is easy to follow because of a laser beam. An electromagnet fixed at the point of suspension powers the movement of the pendulum that would have otherwise stopped. Reliefs in the window niches above the Foucault pendulum show Johannes Hevelius, a design of a reflective sundial (on the left) and a rotating map of the sky with a sextant. These stainless steel reliefs have been made by Robert Kaja. A relief of a well-known Gdańsk resident D.G. Fahrenheit was unveiled in the North Courtyard in October 2013. Fahrenheit was a physicist, engineer, inventor and the creator of a mercury thermometer temperature scale. There are two portraits of the great physicist. The first can be found in a window niche. The other is covered with a thick glass pane. Its upper section looks like a network of blood vessels, while the blue-tinted section at the bottom shows crystal-like structures that can often be seen on glass when temperature is lower than 0 °C or 32 °F. In the middle there is an image of a Fahrenheit thermometer.

The historic gas meters 

While the university buildings were being completed in 1904 the mains gas supply was installed at the same time. The internal gas distribution system started at the porter's lodge with the main valve and the gas meters fitted in a purpose designed cabinet located nearby. The permanent exhibition of the Gdańsk University of Technology historic water powered gas meters that remain on their original site shows the well-preserved fragments of the original system.

Gatehouses at the main entrance gate 

The gatehouses are two small lodges in front of the main building positioned symmetrically along the main axis.  On the eastern side there is a porter's lodge (with an image of a key) and a cottage which officially belonged to the head electrician (with a flower image, it was more likely to be a gardener's house). After modernisation the structures became the headquarters of the Promotion Office and the main reception.

Two lions placed on the balconies of both houses 

The lion on the eastern side holds the coat of arms of the city of Gdańsk.

Owl Sculpture 

There is a rebuilt life-size image of an owl at the porter's lodge which is a symbol of knowledge and wisdom.

Machine Laboratory 

The historic chimney and the adjacent water tower rising above the buildings of the Gdańsk University of Technology campus were created as part of the Machine Laboratory. Built in 1904 and based on the design by Hermann Eggertt and Albert Carsten, those buildings met the university's heating, water and electricity needs as well as offering more teaching space. The structure consisted of a basement machine room with an adjoining boiler-house, a chimney situated between them with an adjacent water tower and a set of rooms. The system was designed by Prof. Josse. This was the first peaking power plant in Gdańsk in 1945 serving the residents of the Gdansk district of Wrzeszcz.

The laboratory was expanded and modernized in 1994–1997 and has retained many of its original technical features.

Cooling tower 

The cooling tower and the machine operator building were erected close to the laboratory.

The steel-frame cooling tower, 28m high, designed to work as a closed circuit system was built on a granite foundation behind the machine hall. The lower part is a cold sprinkler of an oval cross-section that served as a heat exchanger. A circular chimney was then placed on the oval cross-section to get a free flow of air. The dome of the cooling tower is crowned with a spearhead.

Building of the Faculty of Electrical and Control Engineering 

The Institute of Electrical and Control Engineering (Elektrotechnisches Institute) was established in 1900–1904 and the building was designed by Hermann Eggertt and Albert Carsten. It consisted of four distinctive spaces and areas interconnected by a corridor: workshops and laboratories with a small auditorium hall, a machine hall (Drive Hall), an auditorium hall and laboratories, and the drafting hall with additional rooms. Today, the building is named after Prof. Kazimierz Kopecki. The building now houses large auditoriums, a renovated auditorium E1 and a historic auditorium E41 named after Prof. Stanisław Szpor. Following extensive renovation and restoration the latter was returned to its original appearance going back to 1904.

Completed in 2011 the work of renovation, modernization and fitting the historic rooms with modern audiovisual and ICT equipment was funded by the project "Modern Auditoriums at Gdańsk University of Technology."

One of the most interesting sculptures on the university campus can be found on the façade of the building. It shows a couple kissing – the young woman is holding an ear of grain and the man has a burning flame torch in his hand.

Auditorium E1 

The laboratory building was erected as an extension to the main building.

Between 2006 and 2008, the interior of the laboratory of Electrical Drives classroom was remodelled and the room was changed into a lecture auditorium. At the back of the E-1 auditorium there is a permanent exhibition of historic electrical measurement equipment.

The building of the Chemical Faculty – "Old Chemistry" 

The Chemical Institute (Chemisches Institut) building was one of the first built specially for Gdańsk University of Technology in 1900–1904.

The main entrance is decorated with a set of symbols relating to the purpose of the building. Above the entrance arch there is a decorative cartouche (currently with the inscription "CHEMISTRY") crowned with a triangular open tympanum.

The refurbishment of the north wing of the Chemistry A building, that includes the Chemical Auditorium and infrastructure rooms, was completed in 2010.

Symbols of chemical elements 

The symbols of chemical elements are evenly spaced along the top edge of the facade in the side wings of the Chemical Faculty building. The 24 characters – heavily stylized abbreviations of the symbols of chemical elements – have been divided into 4 groups of 6 symbols each. The non-metals were placed on the west wing, while metals on the east one.

The elements are depicted by the symbols used in the late 19th and early 20th century.

Gdańsk Tech Chemical Auditorium 

The interior of the auditorium has regained its early 20th-century appearance following a renovation. The historic auditorium has retained 80 percent of the original fittings and interior design: the decorative wall paintings, decorative architectural elements of the arches, laboratory tables, chairs with back supports and desks. Stoneware laboratory sinks were also preserved along with the wooden windows – including the door handles, fittings and hinges – doors and the electrically controlled window shutters.

Periodic Table 

The periodic table originally painted in 1904 and discovered during the renovation of the Chemical Auditorium reflects the knowledge of chemistry in the early 20th century.

Campus

The university campus consists of many buildings built with various architectural styles over the last one hundred years. The monumental Main Building designed at the beginning of the 20th century in the Dutch Neo-Renaissance style by Albert Cersten – an architect and a university professor – is the symbol of the university.

During the second world war 60 percent of the building and 70 percent of its roofing got burnt. The steel framework was the only remains of the clock tower. The damages were rebuilt but the decision on the tower reconstruction was put off many times. It was rebuilt on the Main Building 13 May 2012.

The campus of the Gdańsk University of Technology is continuously being developed. Elegant, modern, and eco-friendly buildings co-exist with charming and majestic edifices. Classes take place in modern auditoriums and well equipped specialised laboratories.

There are following modern educational and research centers along with supporting units within the university campus:
 Nanotechnology Centre with 25 laboratories equipped with devices for tests and level of atoms

LINTE^2 Laboratory of Innovative Electrical Power Technologies and Integration of Renewable Energy Sources.
 Maths and Distance Learning Centre that uses modern ICT technologies and tools for mathematical modeling and visualization of data. 
 ICT Educational and Research Centre
that collaborates with over 100 companies in Pomerania and their partners in Kuyavia and Mazovia regions.
 Academic Sports Centre – sports facilities accessible to all students and employees: two swimming-pools: 25 m and 12,5 m; a full size football pitch 64m x 105m; a sports hall, a volleyball pitch, outdoor tennis courts; a fitness gym, bodybuilding gyms, a rowing gym, and a judo gym.
Gdańsk University of Technology has a modern student housing estate, which accommodates more than 2,500 people in 11 dormitories located in three attractive locations in the city.

In 2018 magazine Times Higher Education listed the campus of the university among 10 most beautiful universities in Europe, along with e.g. University of Bologna (Italy), University of Salamanca (Spain), and University of Coimbra (Portugal)

Scientific research 
 300 inventions ready for implementation
 200 research and development projects currently carried out
 800 agreements with entrepreneurs concluded in last 3 years

There are high-investment projects carried out under the MAESTRO programme, the Applied Research Programme, the LIDER programme, the INNOTECH programme and the new GRAF-TECH programme. Outstanding students carry out their projects at the university within Diamond Grant programme.

The European HR Excellence in Research logo 
The European Commission has granted Gdańsk University of Technology the right to use the HR Excellence in Research logo.

Rankings 
2021

 In the 21st edition of the Ranking of Universities organized by the Perspektywy Educational Foundation, Gdańsk University of Technology was ranked 6th among all academic universities in the country and 3rd (together with Wrocław University of Science and Technology) among technical universities.
 In the Higher Education Impact Rankings 2021 - the only global ranking based on the Sustainable Development Goals (SDGs) created by the United Nations, Gdańsk University of Technology was classified in the overall ranking and eight individual Sustainable Development Goals. The university fared best in four areas of SDGs, ranking first among Polish universities in each of them. Gdańsk Tech was in the range of 101-200 in the global ranking in area no. 9 (Innovation, industry, infrastructure) and area no. 13 (Climate action). Gdańsk Tech was also classified in the range of 301-400 in area no. 12 (Responsible consumption and production), and as the only university in Poland, it was ranked in the range of 401-600 in area no. 16 (Peace, justice and strong institutions).

2020

 In the QS World University Rankings 2021 edition, Gdańsk University of Technology was ranked for the second time in the range of 801-1000 of the best universities out of over 5.5 thousand universities from 80 countries, slightly improving its total score from 11.7 points in the 2020 edition to 12.8 points in 2021. Similarly to the previous edition of the ranking, Gdańsk Tech achieved the best result in the Faculty Student Ratio area.
 In the 20th edition of the Ranking of Universities organized by the Perspektywy Educational Foundation, Gdańsk University of Technology ranked 8th among all academic universities in the country (together with the Łódź University of Technology) and 4th among technical universities.
 In the U-Multirank 2020 ranking, which was attended by 1,759 universities from 92 countries, including 37 Polish universities, Gdańsk University of Technology received the highest possible "A" score in the following areas: External Research Income, Interdisciplinary Publications, Post-doc positions, Income from private sources, Graduate companies.
 In 2020, in the GreenMetric World Ranking of Universities, in which universities are assessed in terms of the practical application of the principles of sustainable development, Gdańsk Tech improved its previous result, ranking 231st in the world ranking, 78th among European universities and maintaining the 2nd place in the country.
 In 2020, Gdańsk University of Technology was among the 1000 best universities in the world in the Times Higher Education World University Rankings.

2019

 Gdańsk University of Technology has been at the forefront of the ranking of the Ministry of Science and Higher Education measuring the popularity of studies among candidates for years. In the 2018/19 academic year it took the first place for the second time in a row, with a result of 8.8 candidates for one place in full-time first-cycle studies and uniform master's studies. Out of 29,500 candidates, 4,385 people were accepted for first-cycle and second-cycle studies (including 3,366 for full-time first-cycle studies). The greatest number of applicants was interested in the following fields: economics (33 people per place), management in English (28.8) and economic analysis (22.5).
 In the GreenMetric ranking, in which universities are ranked in terms of the implementation of the principles of sustainable development around their campuses, Gdańsk Tech was placed 277th in the world ranking, 104th among European universities, and obtained 2nd place in Poland.

2018

 Gdańsk University of Technology took the first place again in the ranking of the Ministry of Science and Higher Education of universities most frequently chosen by candidates. In 2018, on average, there were 8.8 high school graduates per one place.
 In the 19th edition of the Ranking of Universities, organized by the Perspektywy Educational Foundation, Gdańsk University of Technology ranked 9th among all academic universities in the country (together with the Silesian University of Technology) and 4th among technical universities.
 In 2018, in the third edition of the Competition and the Program for Accreditation of Study Courses "Studies with the Future" organized by the Foundation for the Development of Science and Higher Education supervised by the Ministry of National Education, 16 fields of study at Gdańsk University of Technology were awarded, which was the largest number of awards among universities in Poland.
 In 2018, the Times Higher Education portal placed Gdańsk University of Technology campus on the list of 10 European universities distinguished by beautiful architecture and attractive location.

2017

 In 2017, 7 faculties obtained accreditation in the highest categories A and A +, awarded by the Scientific Units Evaluation Committee.
 In 2017, in the ranking of Perspektywy Gdańsk University of Technology was ranked 10th among the best Polish universities. In the classification of technical universities, the "Perspektywy University Ranking" placed Gdańsk Tech in the 4th place.
 Gdańsk Tech is among 9 Polish universities classified in the Times Higher Education World University Rankings, which includes the best universities in the world.
 Transparent Ranking 2017, which classifies universities according to the number of citations in Google Scholar, placed Gdańsk Tech on 1,306 place among over 9,000 universities in the world.

2016

 In 2016, the Perspektywy Education Foundation placed the Gdańsk University of Technology MBA studies among the top 10 MBA programs in Poland.

Research university 
In 2019, in the competition organized by the Ministry of Science and Higher Education within the "Initiative of Excellence – Research University" program, Gdańsk University of Technology was recognized by the international team of experts as the second best university in Poland, thus obtaining the status of the so-called research university, educating and conducting research at the highest level.

Thanks to the "Initiative of Excellence - Research University" program, four research centers were established at Gdańsk University of Technology: BioTechMed Center, EcoTech Center, Advanced Materials Center and Digital Technologies Center.

BioTechMed Center deals with research and implementation of modern technologies in the field of biomedical engineering, molecular and pharmaceutical biotechnology as well as methods of searching for new drugs. Researchers are working on new biomedical measurement methods (also using artificial intelligence methods), patient diagnosis and therapy, and dedicated device control systems that are widely used in medicine, including rehabilitation and exoskeletons. The work will also aim at developing a strategy of nutritional prevention in chronic non-communicable diseases. The new Center includes specialists in biomedical and genetic engineering, molecular biotechnology, chemistry and drug analysis, and food biotechnology. They have been cooperating with the medical community for years, developing new solutions for healthcare.

Scientists from Gdańsk University of Technology created, among others, CyberEye - a system that allows us to communicate with people in a vegetative state or awakened from a coma. The researchers have developed and implemented modern hearing, vision and speech screening methods that are currently used throughout the world. Research groups of Gdańsk University of Technology have prepared new compounds that may find application in cancer chemotherapy and in the treatment of infections caused by fungal microorganisms. Members of the Center also have significant successes in research on counteracting drug resistance of microorganisms and cancer cells, which is one of the biggest challenges of today's medicine.

Researchers plan to develop new, innovative medical instruments and devices. They will prepare, among others, a new method of hearing testing and automatic detection of disease states. They will create CyberBed, which will help counteract digital exclusion of paralysed patients. They are also developing the world's first so-called biomarkers of human memory that will allow better understanding and optimization of methods for improving memory. Researchers will also define new strategies to combat drug resistance of pathogenic microorganisms, as well as develop new methods for diagnosis and therapy of patients. The teams will also work on new solutions in the field of physicochemistry as well as chemo and radiotherapy, and will also develop technologies that will contribute to the development of the healthy food market.

EcoTech Center deals with shaping a harmonious, sustainable space for human life in the face of current environmental challenges, climate change as well as social and demographic changes. Scientists are working on solutions that will counteract the negative effects of human activities. They are also looking for innovative pro-ecological solutions for intelligent urban and extra-urban areas. In addition, they are developing new methods for monitoring the environment and infrastructure, as well as modern technologies for the production of electricity and heat, which reduce the carbon footprint and contribute to meeting emission requirements. The Center includes research teams composed of representatives of all scientific disciplines of Gdańsk University of Technology, and specialists working on sustainable shaping of human environment play a significant role there.

Teams of researchers are developing and implementing new methods for monitoring the environment and infrastructure, as well as technologies for water and wastewater treatment (including management and reuse of rainwater) and to reduce the phenomenon of so-called ‘Light smog’ (light pollution). Experts deal with innovative solutions in the field of eco-energy, green technologies, low-emission transport, waste management, clean industrial production, energy-neutral construction and renewable energy sources (and their integration with the power system).

The result of the activities of scientists will be the development of a number of solutions to monitor the environment and infrastructure, and to counteract the so-called anthropopression, i.e. human influence on the natural environment. Scientific analyzes and technologies and engineering solutions developed on their basis will meet the principles of sustainable development and the requirements of the circular economy. An important element will also be to support the spatial planning of 'the future ecocities of 2050', i.e. cities resilient to climate change and ensuring high quality of life. These studies will be supplemented with analyzes of social acceptance of new technologies and building new business models for the solutions being developed. Scientists are working on solutions that will counteract the negative effects of human activities.

Advanced Materials Center focus on the production and characterization of innovative materials (including polymer and carbon, nanomaterials, superconductors and high-temperature conductive materials) with wide application in industry and medicine, but also aeronautics and oceanotechnics. In addition, scientists at the Center are dealing with issues related to the technology of manufacturing and obtaining innovative structures and instruments, material recycling and metrology. Within the Center, there are scientists from the field of material engineering specializing in chemistry, physics and solid state electronics, electrochemistry, polymer chemistry, biomaterial engineering, surface engineering and physicochemistry of metal materials.

Research teams already have a number of successes in this area, e.g. research on atomic and electronic structures and chemical composition have allowed the discovery of new superconductors. Scientists have also developed photo-catalysts that allow the oxidation of pharmaceuticals that are not susceptible to biodegradation. In turn, modification of road bitumens with polymers allowed for the development of a wide group of so-called polymer-asphalt binders (binders connecting loose materials into a homogeneous mass), characterized by better resistance to environmental factors and changing temperature conditions.

The results of the Center's activity will be the development of materials for the storage of electricity from renewable energy sources (including wind farms, solar panels, etc.), which will meet the current trends in the energy market and the challenges of today's world. Thanks to the work of Gdańsk University of Technology scientists, it will be possible to create new ways to store and convert excess energy in innovative batteries and supercapacitors, but also to use them at a later time using photovoltaic devices and electrolysers. Research will also be conducted here on carbonaceous materials (including diamond-like ones) that can be used in biosensor systems or for the utilization of impurities. Further research teams will work among others on materials for regenerative medicine, as well as on materials for generating strong magnetic fields. The work of scientists within the Advanced Materials Center focuses on manufacturing innovative materials

Digital Technologies Center develops technologically advanced solutions in the field of electronics, IT, automation, robotics and mechatronics as well as telecommunications. Researchers are working to improve the broadly understood safety and comfort of society. They will enable an increase in the efficiency of enterprises and institutions by preparing systems for more efficient management of their structure. Research teams in the Digital Technologies Center are also working on projects in the field of robotization and automation. They will create innovative design techniques and production technologies that will allow the development of completely new sensors, devices and systems with innovative practical applications. The Center includes specialists in the field of developing new techniques for designing systems and devices used in the ICT industry and innovative data processing algorithms, including using artificial intelligence algorithms.

Researchers have had significant successes and are authors of innovative solutions in the field of design techniques for miniature sensors on flexible substrates, human-machine communication, safe and reliable wireless radio links (including those for autonomous vehicles and infrastructure systems), as well as methods that allow creating high quality software. Scientists of Gdańsk University of Technology will contribute to the creation of intelligent ambience in the environment of human life: at home and on the street, but also in the functioning of enterprises (including logistics centers). They will also develop technologies to increase the productivity of harbours and logistics areas, which is particularly important for the university located within the activities of large harbours.

The result of this work will include miniature electronic systems (placed inside objects and devices that surround people on a daily basis), which will allow automatic adaptation of a specific space to human needs. They will also be used in vehicles and autonomous systems. New wireless communication methods, which will be created thanks to the work of scientists of Gdańsk University of Technology, will allow the creation of harmoniously operating networks of devices and systems within intelligent environments - also using artificial intelligence and machine learning algorithms. Scientists are working to improve the broadly understood safety and comfort of society

Gdańsk University of Technology, in cooperation with the socio-economic environment, established two university-wide, interdisciplinary research centers: the Offshore Wind Energy Center and the Hydrogen Technologies Center. The task of both centers is to coordinate research, design and expert works for the construction of offshore wind farms and modern hydrogen technologies in the energy sector.

Offshore Wind Energy Center brings together outstanding specialists from all areas of knowledge related to offshore wind energy and has a highly specialized laboratory base that allows for detailed identification of many technical and organizational problems in the construction and operation of offshore wind farms. The Center offers scientific support in the field of design, manufacturing technology, operation of offshore wind farms, conducts research, advises on how to solve technical problems, and trains management and engineering staff.

The center's activities are focused on such research areas as: design of special vessels, diagnostics of the mechanical and hydraulic system of a wind turbine, design and diagnostics of a wind turbine rotor, comprehensive corrosion protection of wind turbine towers, underwater and water safety of wind farms, foundation of offshore wind turbines, design of storage systems for excess wind energy, design of power control and electricity transmission systems, staff training and management in offshore wind energy.

Hydrogen Technologies Center is the first unit of this type in Poland to offer research services related to hydrogen. The Center concentrates on the competences in the field of processing, storing and combustion of hydrogen as well as processing energy obtained in fuel cells. The Center is a unit dedicated to cooperation with the industry, including the practical application of scientific achievements, and deals with comprehensive service of hydrogen projects (from the concept phase, through designing solutions, modeling the manufacturing process as well as diagnostics and maintenance of the developed solutions), as well as the development and maintenance of existing technologies using hydrogen. Moreover, it offers specialized services necessary when applying for European funds, specialized expertise for which modern diagnostic and measurement equipment is used, commissioned tests, organization of training courses. The Center's activities are focused on the following research areas: fuel cell diagnostics, hydrogen storage (chemical hydrogen storage), hydrogen production (biohydrogen), energy production (functional coatings), energy conversion (automation / power engineering), modeling of hydrogen processes (modeling / decision-making support systems / artificial intelligence).

Recent achievements at Gdańsk Tech

Cyber-eye
A cyber-eye can help people who fall into a coma. The device consists of an infrared camera and a special program that reads the eyeball movement. The cyber-eye allows to follow the place on the computer screen which the user observes. Thanks to it the patient can inform that he is thirsty or that a window needs to be opened. The authors of the system won the “Polish Innovation 2013” competition organized by the Ministry of Science and Higher Education. The invention is a part of the series of types of computer multimodal interfaces project.

MEDEYE
Within 15 minutes it indicates a suspicious fragment in the recording where there may be an ulcer, bleeding, a polyp or another disease. It sends information about the completed analysis by text message or by email. A system to support the diagnostic endoscopic examination of the human digestive tract named MEDEYE has been designed to make the work of a physician more efficient. It analyses and interprets the image from a tiny camera closed in a capsule. Thanks to the MEDEYE the physician does not have to watch several-hourlong recordings but can concentrate on the fragments indicated by the system.

PathMon 
An integrated circuit which analyses electrocardiographic and impedance signal which contain an information about the cardiac cycle. PathMon makes possible simultaneous measurement of various vital signs. The analysis in real time allows detection of some untypical events which indicate threat to health or life. The device shows condition of the heart, effectiveness of blood pump and blood vessels’ contractility.

Medicine for osteoporosis
Most medicines available on the global market which contain alendronate sodium contain a biologically active substance manufactured by Polpharma SA basing on the technology developed at Gdańsk University of Technology. A single pack of Ostemax 70 comfort that contains 4 pills costs 25–30 PLN. In 2013 Polpharma SA was awarded the President of the Republic of Poland's Award for Innovation in recognition of its work on innovative technologies and launching a series of substances used for osteoporosis treatment.

NOR-STA Platform
The NOR-STA Platform is a platform of innovative software services facilitating achieving and assessing conformance to norms and standards – including hospital accreditation, CAF (Common Assessment Framework), information security management systems and HACCP standards. The users of the platform indicate its following major advantages: improved document management, retaining conformance, support for decision making process and time saving. This solution was awarded with the Gold Medal – Consumer Choice at the Poznań International Fair.

Electronic nose 

Electronic nose developed in Analytical Chemistry Department at Chemical Faculty allows for rapid classification of food or environmental samples. The cost of this equipment is far lower than commercialized instruments of such kind.

Auditory–Visual Attention Simulator 
The interface will support people with disabilities of eyesight and hearing, as well as children with ADHD, as a multimedia stimulator of binocular vision in cases of “amblyopia” (“lazy eye” syndrome). An original application is a set of tools and tests to diagnose degree of awareness of persons with no contact (in coma or vegetative state); the interface was awarded gold medal of the Poznań International Fair within the competition Economy for Science, and was also awarded with the international exhibition of inventions BRUSSELS INNOVA 2012.

Joint ventures 
The university carries out dozens of different kinds of agreements with the business environment. Examples of cooperation:
 Pomeranian Metropolitan Railway SA realization of geodetic inventory measurements of railway track and acceptance testing of viaducts
 Airbus Helicopters joint research and scientific programs in the field of marine technologies (improving support systems for helicopters on flights over large water bodies), training of engineers
 European Dental Implant Institute Vivadental; cooperation in the creation of a prototype of a dental implant designed for industrial production
 ACCUS project – a partnership 28 scientific institutions and companies from eight EU countries: creation of the most advanced types of SmartCity system in Europe, which will be launchedin Gdańsk
 Bohemia Interactive: Common Crisis Management Laboratory at Gdańsk University of Technology, which will carry out research on training methods and crisis management
 Sunreef Yachts: research support for the company from the university; internships and a series of lectures for students from SY
 IBM: joint IBM Advanced Research Center (the Center for Advanced Studies) operates within the Hub for Innovative Technologies at Gdańsk Tech. Its task is the implementation of projects in the field of information technologies in conjunction with the business strategy of IBM
 Gdansk Municipal Investments Sp. Z oo: participation in a team of scientific advisers to build a tunnel under Martwa Wisła (the Dead Vistula)
 The Company for Exploitation of Oil Pipelines "Przyjaźń": the development of innovative solutions for oil and chemical logistics, performing analyses, expert and technical studies
 Polpharma: cooperation in the development of synthesis and manufacturing technology of new drugs production
 Blirt: cooperation in the development of innovative cancer and antimicrobial drugs, including joint initiatives in the framework of strategic NCBR programs of STRATEGMED type
 MedVentures Sp. Z o.o and Pro-Science Poland Sp. z oo: cooperation within the program STRATEGMED in the project "New technologies in pharmacological stimulation of regeneration"

Faculties

Faculty of Architecture
Faculty of Electronics, Telecommunications and Informatics
Faculty of Electrical and Control Engineering
Faculty of Applied Physics and Mathematics
Faculty of Civil and Environmental Engineering
Faculty of Mechanical Engineering
Faculty of Ocean Engineering and Ship Technology
Faculty of Management and Economics

Chemical Faculty

Chemical Faculty was one of the four original faculties of 'Royal Technical College in Gdańsk', operating continuously in the pre-war German technical university since its establishment. The Chemical Institute (Chemisches Institut) building was one of the first built specially for Gdańsk University of Technology in 1900–1904.

Famous for his discovery of sex hormones Adolf Butenandt was professor at the Technical University of Danzig 1933–1936. Here at Chemisches Institut he was continuing his works over hormones extracting from several thousand liters of urine progesterone in 1934 and testosterone a year later. Subsequently, Butenandt had synthesized estrogen and testosterone. Adolf Butenandt also had characterized the first pheromone, bombykol, a chemically well-characterized sexual hormone released by the female silkworm to attract mates. While working in Gdańsk Butenandt has obtained a substantial part of research results awarded later by Nobel Committee in 1939.

Chemical Faculty is one of five faculties, which started operations research and teaching in 1945, as a result of the decree of the Polish government transforming technical university acting in Gdańsk since 1904 into Polish Gdańsk University of Technology. To this day, it works in rooms designed specifically for training chemists, since 1904 operate here labs, preserved historic auditorium, which original equipment is unique in the world.

In the period of 1945–2005 from the Chemical Faculty graduated more than 7000 people, including 4877 masters of engineering and 1967 engineers. PhD degree was given 565, and 97 DSc degrees (habilitations). A total of 43 professors have held posts at Gdańsk Tech during this time. The Chemical Faculty has worldwide research ties and ranks consistently among the top 10 Polish public colleges and universities in funded research.

As early as in 1904 the laboratories in the Chemical Faculty at the Technical University in Gdańsk were equipped with wooden fume hoods. That was one of earliest applications of that kind in the world. Harmful and corrosive gaseous byproducts of reactions were actively sucked allowing safe operation with chemicals. There were used the natural draft of a fireplace chimney to remove these substances from the lab. This unique in the world equipment is well maintained and still in daily use for almost 120 years.

At the faculty there are realized projects financed by the Komitet Badań Naukowych (Science Research Council) and European Commission. Faculty research teams collaborate with foreign centers from several countries. At the faculty operates the Centre of Excellence in Environmental Analysis and Monitoring. 
The Chemical Faculty's scientific activity is performed within the framework of domestic and international research programmes. There are around 70 ongoing projects with financial support from the Polish State Committee for Scientific Research as well as 200 projects financed by Statutory research programmes. There are also research programmes financed by the European Commission within the framework of EU programmes V and VI.

International cooperation
Gdańsk University of Technology takes part in the European ERASMUS programme: Erasmus Plus, LLP Erasmus, LLP Erasmus Intensive Programs, Erasmus Mundus, Jean Monnet, CEEPUS, TEMPUS and Leonardo da Vinci. 
Number of foreign students and visitors from all over the world grows year after year. The biggest groups of international students come from: Spain and China.

Gdańsk Tech participates in activities of IRO's Forum and the Baltic Sea Region University Network, whose purpose is to exchange experiences between universities in the fields of: internationalization of universities, exchange of students, intercultural communication, joint degree programs, internationalization at home or promotion abroad.

Centre for Knowledge and Technology Transfer 

Gdańsk University of Technology cooperates with the world of business on various planes, and its relationship with the economic community is continually developing. Since March 2009 the university has had its own Centre for Knowledge and Technology Transfer (CTWT), where business people and scientists can meet.
Thus innovative ideas reach those who are able to implement them and scientists obtain a better understanding of what the market needs. The Centre collaborates with many enterprises and represents them in dealings with, for instance, the Pomeranian Development Agency, Pomeranian Business Council, Pomerania Special Economic Zone, science and technology parks, other universities, Pomerania Regional Chamber of Commerce, Gdańsk International Fair, and various economic councils. Through this Centre Gdańsk Tech particularly wants to help small and medium-sized enterprises.
Support will also be provided to students and graduates who want to start their own business activities. Moreover, the Centre acts for the protection of intellectual property. In addition to this, the university makes numerous contracts concerning student internships and work experience. Leading firms in the Pomeranian region provide research grants and scholarships to the most talented students, as well as awarding prizes for the best diploma works and doctoral theses.
The best known figures in business participate in student debates, give lectures or provide training in self-presentation or company management. The university organises conferences with the participation of business people. For several years now Gdańsk University of Technology has been participating in the Technicon Innovations Science, Business and Industry Fair, during which a broad range of the newest inventions and their implementations is presented. Annual participation in this fair has resulted in the awarding of many prizes, including ones from competitions for the best innovations and technological solutions. The inventions of Gdańsk Tech students and staff have also been awarded prizes at international fairs.

Gdańsk Tech's Computer Network 

The Academic Computer Centre in Gdańsk (CI TASK) is one of the largest urban internet networks in Poland. It has been operating since 1992 thanks to an agreement reached between the Tri-City's chief institutions of higher education. Gdańsk University of Technology has played the leading role in constructing this metropolitan network. The initial plan was for it to primarily serve all schools of higher education as well as local branches of the Polish Academy of Sciences. Currently TASK is being prepared to include all schools in Gdańsk, of which there are over hundred.

Entrusted with the management and expansion of this metropolitan network is the TASK Computer Centre, which was set up at Gdańsk University of Technology in 1994. Today it is based in the new Faculty of Electronics, Telecommunications and Informatics building. As one of the five supercomputer centres in Poland, it provides the scientific community with processing resources in the form of high speed computers and specialist software. These resources help in the development of various fields of knowledge, for example: chemistry, physics, engineering, electronics and oceanography. Presently, there are over 50 projects being realised using the supercomputers at the centre, concerning among other things: molecular modeling of nucleic proteins and acids; quantum chemistry calculations; research into the properties of nanomaterials; modeling wave motion, currents and rising storms in the Baltic Sea and the Bay of Gdańsk; research into Nordic Seas dynamics and also modeling the behavior of skeleton muscles. The TASK Computer Centre is co-creating a national PIONIER fibre-optic network for the scientific and information community, and is also actively participating in six projects of the so-called innovative economy: MAYDAY, Pl-Grid, PLATON, Pomeranian Digital Library, Integrated Oceanographic Data System and NEWMAN. Virtually all these projects help to create new jobs. The total value in the region of 300 million zlotys. At the start of 2008 the Centre installed Galera, a computer cluster with the theoretical computer power over 50 Tflops. Thanks to Galera, the TASK Computer Centre has become one of the world's leading supercomputing sites. Galera was in 2014 still listed among the world's 200 fastest computers in the prestigious TOP 500 chart.

In 2015 the next generation computer cluster TRYTON started at CD NIWA. At the moment of starting it was the fastest computer in Poland, in June 2015 was listed at the 128 position on chart of world's TOP500 supercomputers with the theoretical power over 530 Tflops.

Library 

The Gdańsk University of Technology Library is the oldest and largest technical library in Northern Poland. Among the libraries of the world it can boast unique collection of priceless manuscripts and old prints from the Danzig Research Society, which was founded in 1743, and donated its 30,000 – volume collection to this library in 1923. The library's current collection includes over a million volumes, including textbooks, lecture notes, books on science and technology, Polish and foreign scientific journals, as well as technical and trade literature. Moreover, the library stores publications in electronic form, to which it provides access via an on-line database. Every year the collection is expanded by new Polish and foreign publications concerning all aspects of science and technology.

The library system is very modern. Students can find the book or journal they are looking for in an on-line catalogue together with up-to-date information and whether it can be borrowed or read only in the reading room. By using their personal internet accounts, they can also prolong the time they borrow publications. There are a total of 16 reading rooms, ten in faculty branches of the library including specialist reading rooms for: journals and databases, scientific information and norms, technology and trade literature, as well as a historical collections reading room. In 2008 the library opened one of the most modern reading rooms in the country, which among other things provides a self-service specialist literature lending and returning facility. Gdańsk University of Technology also provides a digital library. Moreover, it is participating in the creation of the Universal Library, i.e. worldwide digital library, and is also the coordinator of the Pomerania Digital Library. This internet library will comprise digital reproductions of scanned historical documents (lettered and unlettered). The intention is to digitalize an estimated total of over 20 million pages from Pomeranian library collections.

110th anniversary of Gdańsk Tech
Throughout the whole year 2014 the Gdańsk University of Technology celebrated 110 years of its existence. The official inauguration of the jubilee year was in January 2014. The ceremony was held during the public session of the Senate on the occasion of academic promotions. Exactly on the 110th anniversary of the first inauguration – October 6, 2014 – there was the jubilee inauguration of the academic year. It is worth mentioning that a number of eminent personalities, including President Lech Wałęsa, and Minister of Science and Higher Education Lena Kolarska-Bobinska were among the honorary committee of the jubilee. The culmination point was the ceremony of conferring an honorary doctorate of Gdańsk Tech on world-renowned professor of chemistry Robert Cava from Princeton University. The main ceremony ended with the concert at the Polish Baltic Philharmonic. The symphony orchestra of PBP with the Gdańsk Tech and Poznań University of Technology choirs performed the oratorio Quo vadis by Feliks Nowowiejski. The next days the Gdańsk Tech organised a meeting with members of the European Federation of National Engineering Associations.

Notable alumni 
 Bodo von Borries (1905—1956), German physicist, co-inventor of electron microscope
 Zygmunt Choreń (born 1941), naval architect
 Jaroslaw Drelich (1957), surface engineer, professor at the Michigan Technological University
 Abraham Esau (1884–1955), German physicist
 Andrzej Gwiazda (born 1935), anti-communist activist and physicist
 Richard B. Hetnarski (born 1928), Polish-American mechanical engineer 
 Tomasz Imieliński (born 1954), Polish-American computer scientist
 Michał Kalecki (1899–1970), Marxian economist, "one of the most distinguished economists of the 20th century" 
 Włodzimierz Julian Korab-Karpowicz (born 1953), philosopher and political theorist
 Janusz Liberkowski (born 1953), inventor
 Lâm Quang Mỹ (born 1944), Polish-Vietnamese physicist and poet
 Jacek Namieśnik (1949–2019), chemist
 Janusz Pawliszyn (born 1954), chemist
 Marek Piechocki (born 1961), civil engineer, co-founder of LPP Group
 Kazimierz Piechowski (1919–2017), engineer
 Janusz Smulko (born 1964), electronics engineer
 Wojciech Szpankowski (born 1952), computer scientist
 Marianna Sankiewicz-Budzyńska (1921–2018) electronics engineer

References

External links
 University website
 The buildings of the university
International Office
U-Multirank Ranking
 http://www.nauka.gov.pl/

 
Universities and colleges in Gdańsk
Engineering universities and colleges in Poland
Educational institutions established in 1904
1904 establishments in Germany